If P&C Insurance Company Ltd. is a property and casualty insurance company with approximately 3.8 million customers in Sweden, Norway, Finland, Denmark, Estonia, Latvia and Lithuania. In 2013, the group had gross premiums written of SEK 39 billion and 6,830 employees.

History
If P&C Insurance was formed in 1999 through the merger of the property and casualty insurance operations of Storebrand of Norway and Skandia of Sweden. In 2001, If and Sampo’s property and casualty insurance operations merged.

In 2002, Torbjörn Magnusson was appointed President and CEO.

In the Spring of 2004, Sampo acquired Storebrand's, Skandia's and Skandia Liv's holdings of If shares.

References

Financial services companies established in 1999
Companies based in Solna Municipality
Insurance companies of Sweden
Swedish companies established in 1999